Clometerone (developmental code name L-38000), or clometherone, also known as 6α-chloro-16α-methylprogesterone, is a synthetic pregnane steroid and derivative of progesterone which was reported in 1962 and is described as an antiestrogen and antiandrogen but was never marketed.

Clometerone has been found to suppress estrone-induced uterine hypertrophy in mice at oral and parenteral doses in which progesterone is inactive (active at 10 µg with clometerone and progesterone inactive at 10–100 µg in the case of both routes). However, its progestogenic potency in the Clauberg assay is considerably less than that of progesterone. As such, the progestogenic effects of clometerone do not seem to parallel its estrogenic effects. It was also studied as an antiandrogen in men but was found to slightly increase sebum production when given orally and to variably and inconsistently affect sebum production when given as a topical medication.

See also
 Steroidal antiandrogen
 List of steroidal antiandrogens

References

Abandoned drugs
Antiestrogens
Chloroarenes
Diketones
Pregnanes
Progestogens
Steroidal antiandrogens